Mario Ochoa (born 1982) is a DJ and producer born in Medellin, Colombia. Mario Ochoa got started in music production in 2000 which over the years has made him extremely popular, as his tracks can usually be found in the most important charts around the world. Mario Ochoa is known for his unique House & Tech House music style but he also has ventured into many other EDM genres.

Biography
Born in Medellin (Colombia) Mario's career started in 1999 when he was 18 years old.

In 2003 Mario released his first hit "Habla con la Luna" on Disc Doctor Records which became a huge success on Spain, France, Mexico and South America, being included on more than 70 compilations all over the world. That same year, Mario gets even more exposure when he got signed with to "Poolemusic" property of Antoine Clamaran, French dj and producer who helped a lot to grow Mario's career. Since then, Mario has signed tracks with many other labels such as Ultra, Universal, 100% Pure, Toolroom Records, 1605 Music Therapy, Great Stuff, Kittball, Juicy Music, Nervous Records, Fine Tune, Pacha Records, Ministry of Sound, Subliminal Records, to name a few.

In 2006 Mario launched his own record label "Avenue Recordings", which has released many hits in the past years including several of Mario's own productions and as well trying to help new talents be heard.

In 2008 his track "Much Better" became a massive hit all over the world, played by hundreds of radio stations and supported by the biggest names on the scene.

Then the hits kept coming, singles like "The Indian Express", "BS", "Mr Boom", "Tu va ver", "Lockdown", "Big Spender", "La Cosa Nostra", "La Noche", "The Chant", "Wizard" "Give some Love" (#7 at Billboard's dance chart ) all hitting the charts on the major digital stores around the world.

Also in 2010 Mario started his own Radio/Podcast show, called "Infected Beats" which airs every two weeks. The show lasts 2 hours and includes special guest mixes on every episode.

Biggest Hits

2004 Mario Ochoa - Habla con la luna
2006 Mario Ochoa & Antoine Clamaran - Give some love
2008 Mario Ochoa - Kalua
2008 Mario Ochoa - Wizard
2009 Mario Ochoa - So Serious
2009 Mario Ochoa - Much Better
2009 Mario Ochoa - Twisted
2009 Mario Ochoa - Gorilla
2010 Mario Ochoa - Big Spender
2010 Mario Ochoa - Fuckin
2011 Mario Ochoa - La Noche
2011 Mario Ochoa - Brujos y Hechiceros
2011 Mario Ochoa - Chronos
2012 Mario Ochoa - The Indian Express
2012 Mario Ochoa - The Chant
2012 Mario Ochoa - Mr. Boom
2012 Mario Ochoa - Alpha
2013 Mario Ochoa - Tu Va Ver
2015 Mario Ochoa - Me gusta

External links
 Official Site
 Avenue Recordings

1982 births
Club DJs
Remixers
Living people
Progressive house musicians